The 2014 Texas House of Representatives elections took place as part of the biennial United States elections. Texas voters elected state representatives in all 150 State House of Representatives districts. State representatives serve for two-year terms.

At the beginning of the Eighty-third Texas Legislature following the 2012 Texas State House of Representatives elections, the Democrats held 55 seats to the Republicans' 95.

This election marks the first time Republicans have ever won a state house race in Chambers County.

Results

Statewide

Close races 
This election marked a low point in seat competitiveness for the Texas House of Representatives. 69% of seats only drew candidates from only one major political party, and 45% of seats hosted unopposed races. Only 8% of seats featured more than two political parties, and only 4 races were decided by margins under 10%.

Notable races

Results by district

References 

House of Representatives
Texas House of Representatives elections
Texas House